Brundon is a hamlet in the Babergh district, in the English county of Suffolk. It is located on the River Stour near the town of Sudbury (its post town). For transport there is the A131 road nearby. Brundon was recorded in the Domesday Book as Branduna.

Brundon Hall is a grade II* listed 18th century building which stands near the former Brundon water mill.

See also
Ballingdon

References 

Hamlets in Suffolk
Sudbury, Suffolk